The 1988 NCAA Division I Women's Lacrosse Championship was the seventh annual single-elimination tournament to determine the national championship for Division I National Collegiate Athletic Association (NCAA) women's college lacrosse. The championship game was played at Walton Field in Haverford, Pennsylvania during May 1988. 

The Temple Owls won their second championship by defeating the Penn State Nittany Lions in the final, 15–7. This was a rematch of the previous year's final, won by Penn State. Furthermore, Temple's win secured an undefeated season (19–0) for the Owls. 

The leading scorers for the tournament, all with 8 goals, were Gail Cummings (Temple), Denise Bourassa (Temple), Mandee Moore (Temple), and Tami Worley (Penn State). The Most Outstanding Player trophy was not awarded this year.

Qualification
All NCAA Division I women's lacrosse programs were eligible for this championship. In the end, 6 teams contested this tournament, an increase of two from the previous year.

Tournament bracket

Tournament outstanding players 
Gail Cummings, Temple
Mandee Moore, Temple
Vicki Yocum, Penn State

See also 
 NCAA Division I Women's Lacrosse Championship
 NCAA Division III Women's Lacrosse Championship
 1988 NCAA Division I Men's Lacrosse Championship

References

NCAA Division I Women's Lacrosse Championship
NCAA Division I Women's Lacrosse Championship
NCAA Women's Lacrosse Championship